1994 in Korea may refer to:
1994 in North Korea
1994 in South Korea